Arts education may refer to:

 Performing arts education
 Visual arts education
 Arts in education, an expanding field of educational research 
 Arts Education Policy Review, academic journal